Valley of the Ten Peaks is a valley in Banff National Park in Alberta, Canada, which is crowned by ten notable peaks and also includes Moraine Lake. The valley can be reached by following the Moraine Lake road near Lake Louise. The ten peaks were originally named by Samuel Allen, an early explorer of the region, who simply referred to them by using the numerals from one to ten in the Stoney First Nations Language. He may have learned the terms from his Native American guides, who helped him with the horses. The Nakoda–also known as the Stoney Indians–is a tribe whose culture and dialect are closely related to that of the Assiniboine First Nation, from whom they are believed to have separated in the mid-1700s, and who roamed large parts of the prairies and mountains of western Alberta well into British Columbia. The secluded Valley of the Ten Peaks was part of their original homeland. Gradually, though, all but three of the mountains were renamed in honour of noteworthy individuals, including Allen himself.

Mount Hungabee was not included in the original peak list by Allen, even though it is higher than Wenkchemna Peak, the latter of which is really an extension of Hungabee.

Peaks
The ten peaks, in order of how they are numbered from east to west, are:

There are other peaks visible from within the valley as well, including Mount Temple, Mount Babel and Eiffel Peak. Fay Glacier is developed between Mount Babel, Mount Fay, Mount Little and Mount Bowlen.

The Valley of the Ten Peaks was featured on the reverse side of the 1969 and 1979 issues of the Canadian twenty dollar bill; see .

The Neil Colgan Hut, a mountaineering destination and the highest permanent structure in Canada, can be reached in 8 to 12 hours of climbing the Perren Route from Moraine Lake.

References

Valleys of Alberta
Banff National Park